USS Hidalgo (AK-189) was an  that was constructed for the U.S. Navy during the closing period of World War II. She was declared excess-to-needs and returned to the U.S. Maritime Commission.

Construction
Hidalgo was a diesel-powered C1-M-AV1 cargo hull, was launched 28 July 1944 under Maritime Commission contract, MC hull 2120, by Walter Butler Shipbuilding, Inc., Superior, Wisconsin, sponsored by Mrs. Claude Pepper, wife of the Senator from Florida; placed in service while being towed to Galveston, Texas, and commissioned 4 August 1945.

Service history

World War II Pacific Theatre operations
After conducting a brief shakedown cruise off the coast of Texas, Hidalgo sailed to the Panama Canal Zone for routing to the Pacific Ocean 5 September 1945, but the war's end brought orders to proceed to Norfolk, Virginia.

Post-war decommissioning
The ship arrived in Hampton Roads, Virginia, 11 March 1946 and decommissioned 26 April 1946. Subsequently, she was sold to Turkey for $693,862.00 and serves as cargo ship SS Rize in merchant service.

Merchant service
Hidalgo was renamed Rize in 1947. Along with her sister ships, ex-, renamed Kars, ex-, renamed Kastamonu, and ex-, renamed Edirne, she would, for the next 15 years, provide cargo service between Turkey and Northern Europe. She was finally broken up in the Turkish port of Aliağa in August 1982.

Honors and awards
Qualified Hidalgo personnel were eligible for the following:
 American Campaign Medal
 World War II Victory Medal

Notes 

Citations

Bibliography 

Online resources

External links

 

Alamosa-class cargo ships
Hidalgo County, New Mexico
Hidalgo County, Texas
Ships built in Superior, Wisconsin
1944 ships
World War II auxiliary ships of the United States
Ships transferred from the United States Navy to the Turkish Navy